The 2018–19 BYU Cougars women's basketball team represented Brigham Young University during the 2018–19 NCAA Division I women's basketball season. It was head coach Jeff Judkins's eighteenth season at BYU. The Cougars, members of the West Coast Conference, play their home games at the Marriott Center. In 2019 the Cougars won the West Coast Conference tournament championship game over Gonzaga. In that tournament, Paisley Johnson was named the tournament's Most Outstanding Player. They finished the season 26–7, 15–3 in WCC play to finish in second round. In the NCAA women's tournament as a 7th seed in the Chicago regional they defeated Auburn in the first round before losing to Stanford in the second round.

Before the season

Departures

Newcomers

2018–19 media

BYU Sports Media

All Cougars home games are scheduled to be shown on BYUtv or on TheW.tv powered by Stadium. Conference road games will also be shown on TheW.tv. Most regular season road games will be streamed. Streaming partners for those games can be found on the schedule.

Roster

Schedule

|-
!colspan=8 style=| Exhibition

|-
!colspan=8 style=| Non-conference regular season

|-
!colspan=8 style=| WCC regular season

|-
!colspan=8 style=| WCC Tournament

|-
!colspan=8 style=| NCAA Women's Tournament

Game Summaries

Exhibition: Dixie State
Broadcasters: Robbie Bullough & Makenzi Pulsipher 
Starting Lineups:
Dixie State: London Pavlica, Mariah Martin, Lisa VanCampen, Keslee Stevenson, Maile Richardson
BYU: Brenna Chase, Shalae Salmon, Maria Albiero, Paisley Johnson, Jasmine Moody

UC Riverside
Broadcasters: Jarom Jordan, Kristen Kozlowski, & Lauren McClain 
Series History: BYU leads series 2–0 
Starting Lineups:
UC Riverside: Marina Ewodo, Tianna Eaton, Keilanei Cooper, Jannon Otto, Daphne Gnago
BYU: Brenna Chase, Shalae Salmon, Maria Albiero, Paisley Johnson, Jasmine Moody

Cal
Broadcasters: Robbie Bullough & Makenzi Pulsipher 
Series History: Cal leads series 4–0
Starting Lineups:
Cal: Asha Thomas, Kianna Smith, Recee' Caldwell, Kristine Anigwe, Jaelyn Brown
BYU: Brenna Chase, Shalae Salmon, Maria Albiero, Paisley Johnson, Jasmine Moody

Eastern Washington
Broadcasters: Robbie Bullough & Makenzi Pulsipher
Series History: BYU leads series 4–1 
Starting Lineups:
Eastern Washington: Uriah Howard, Jessica McDowell-White, Violet Kapri Morrow, Brittany Klaman, Alissa Sealby
BYU: Brenna Chase, Shalae Salmon, Maria Albiero, Paisley Johnson, Jasmine Moody

Utah State
Broadcasters: Jaden Johnson
Series History: BYU leads series 35–4
Starting Lineups:
BYU: Brenna Chase, Shalae Salmon, Maria Albiero, Paisley Johnson, Jasmine Moody
Utah State: Eliza West, Olivia West, Shannon Dufficy, Hailey Bassett-Meacham, Rachel Brewster

TCU
Series History: BYU leads series 10–8 
Starting Lineups:
BYU: Brenna Chase, Shalae Salmon, Maria Albiero, Paisley Johnson, Jasmine Moody
TCU: Amy Okonkwo, Jayde Woods, Lauren Heard, Jordan Moore, Kianna Ray

Cal Baptist
Series History: First Meeting
Starting Lineups:
BYU: Brenna Chase, Shalae Salmon, Maria Albiero, Paisley Johnson, Jasmine Moody
Cal Baptist: Ane Olaeta, Emma Meriggioli, Delacy Brown, Tiena Afu, Britney Thomas

Southern Utah
Broadcasters: Kylee Young
Series History: BYU leads series 18–3 
Starting Lineups:
BYU: Brenna Chase, Shalae Salmon, Maria Albiero, Paisley Johnson, Jasmine Moody
Southern Utah: Rebecca Cardenas, Ashley Larsen, Megan Kamps, Breanu Reid, Hannah Robins

Utah Valley
Broadcasters: Matthew Baiamonte
Series History: BYU leads series 8–0
Starting Lineups:
BYU: Brenna Chase, Shaylee Gonzales, Shalae Salmon, Caitlyn Alldredge, Paisley Johnson
Utah Valley: Maria Carvalho, Eve Braslis, Alexis Cortez, Emma Jones, Jordan Holland

Utah
Broadcasters: Krista Blunk & Rosalyn Gold-Onwude
Series History: BYU leads series 63–42 
Starting Lineups:
BYU: Brenna Chase, Shaylee Gonzales, Shalae Salmon, Caitlyn Alldredge, Paisley Johnson
Utah: Megan Huff, Dru Gylten, Erika Bean, Daneesha Provo, Dre'Una Edwards

Colorado State
Broadcasters: Spencer Linton & Lauren McClain
Series History: BYU leads series 54–24
Starting Lineups:
Colorado State: Taylor Mole, Lena Svanholm, Mollie Mounsey, Lore Devos, Tatum Neubert
BYU: Brenna Chase, Shaylee Gonzales, Shalae Salmon, Paisley Johnson, Babalu Ugwu

Northern Colorado
Broadcasters: Robbie Bullough
Series History: BYU leads series 5–4
Starting Lineups:
Northern Colorado: Krystal Leger-Walker, Savannah Smith, Alexis Chapman, Ali Meyer, Bridget Hintz
BYU: Brenna Chase, Shaylee Gonzales, Shalae Salmon, Paisley Johnson, Babalu Ugwu

Santa Clara
Broadcasters: Joe Ritzo
Series History: BYU leads series 15–2
Starting Lineups:
BYU: Brenna Chase, Shaylee Gonzales, Shalae Salmon, Paisley Johnson, Babalu Ugwu
Santa Clara: Tia Hay, Joeseta Fatuesi, Lauren Yearwood, Ashlyn Herlihy, Emily Wolph

San Francisco
Broadcasters: George Devine
Series History: BYU leads series 17–5
Starting Lineups:
BYU: Brenna Chase, Shaylee Gonzales, Shalae Salmon, Paisley Johnson, Babalu Ugwu
San Francisco: Kia Vaalavirta, Marta Galic, Moa Lundqvist, Lucija Kostic, Shannon Powell

Pepperdine
Broadcasters: Spencer Linton & Kristen Kozlowski
Series History: BYU leads series 17–2
Starting Lineups:
Pepperdine: Malia Bambrick, Deezha Battle, Barbara Sitanggan, Skye Lindsay, Yasmine Robinson-Bac
BYU: Brenna Chase, Shaylee Gonzales, Shalae Salmon, Paisley Johnson, Babalu Ugwu

Loyola Marymount
Broadcasters: Spencer Linton & Kristen Kozlowski
Series History: BYU leads series 15–2
Starting Lineups:
Loyola Marymount: Chelsey Gipson, Jasmine Jones, Bree Alford, Gabby Green, Cierra Belvin
BYU: Brenna Chase, Shaylee Gonzales, Shalae Salmon, Paisley Johnson, Babalu Ugwu

Pacific
Broadcasters: Don Gubbins
Series History: BYU leads series 13–4
Starting Lineups:
BYU: Brenna Chase, Shaylee Gonzales, Shalae Salmon, Paisley Johnson, Babalu Ugwu
Pacific: Brooklyn McDavid, Isabel Newman, Jessica Blakeslee, Ameela Li, Valerie Higgins

Saint Mary's
Broadcasters: Elias Feldman
Series History: Saint Mary's leads series 9–8
Starting Lineups:
BYU: Brenna Chase, Shaylee Gonzales, Shalae Salmon, Paisley Johnson, Babalu Ugwu
Saint Mary's: Jasmine Forcadilla, Madeline Holland, Sydney Raggio, Sam Simons, Megan McKay

Gonzaga
Broadcasters: Spencer Linton & Kristen Kozlowski
Series History: Gonzaga leads series 15–9
Starting Lineups:
Gonzaga: Zykera Rice, LeeAnne Wirth, Laura Stockton, Katie Campbell, Chandler Smith
BYU: Brenna Chase, Shaylee Gonzales, Shalae Salmon, Paisley Johnson, Babalu Ugwu

Portland
Broadcasters: Spencer Linton & Kristen Kozlowski
Series History: BYU leads series 22–4
Starting Lineups:
Portland: Kate Andersen, Haylee Andrews, Jayce Gorzeman, Julie Spencer, Darian Slaga
BYU: Brenna Chase, Shaylee Gonzales, Shalae Salmon, Paisley Johnson, Babalu Ugwu

San Diego
Broadcasters: Paula Bott
Series History: BYU leads series 12–6
Starting Lineups:
BYU: Brenna Chase, Shaylee Gonzales, Shalae Salmon, Paisley Johnson, Babalu Ugwu
San Diego: Aminata Dosso, Madison Pollock, Sydney Shephard, Sydney Hunter, Patricia Brossman

Loyola Marymount
Broadcasters: Jonathan Grayson
Series History: BYU leads series 16–2
Starting Lineups:
BYU: Brenna Chase, Shaylee Gonzales, Shalae Salmon, Paisley Johnson, Babalu Ugwu
Loyola Marymount: Chelsey Gipson, Andee Velasco, Jasmine Jones, Bree Alford, Cierra Belvin

Pepperdine
Broadcasters: Darren Preston
Series History: BYU leads series 18–2
Starting Lineups:
BYU: Brenna Chase, Shaylee Gonzales, Shalae Salmon, Paisley Johnson, Babalu Ugwu
Pepperdine: Malia Bambrick, Megan House, Barbara Sitanggan, Yasmine Robinson-Bac, Mia Satie

Saint Mary's
Broadcasters: Spencer Linton & Kristen Kozlowski
Series History: Series Even 9–9
Starting Lineups:
Saint Mary's: Jasmine Forcadilla, Sydney Raggio, Sam Simons, Emily Codding, Megan McKay
BYU: Brenna Chase, Shaylee Gonzales, Shalae Salmon, Paisley Johnson, Babalu Ugwu

Pacific
Broadcasters: Spencer Linton & Kristen Kozlowski
Series History: BYU leads series 14–4
Starting Lineups:
Pacific: Brooklyn McDavid, Isabel Newman, Jessica Blakeslee, Ameela Li, Valerie Higgins
BYU: Brenna Chase, Shaylee Gonzales, Shalae Salmon, Paisley Johnson, Sara Hamson

Portland
Broadcasters: Tom Kolker
Series History: BYU leads series 23–4
Starting Lineups:
BYU: Brenna Chase, Shaylee Gonzales, Shalae Salmon, Paisley Johnson, Sara Hamson
Portland: Haylee Andrews, Lisa-Marie Kaempf, Jayce Gorzeman, Julie Spencer, Darian Slaga

Gonzaga
Broadcasters: Greg Heister, Stephanie Hawk-Freeman, & Taylor Brooks
Series History: Gonzaga leads series 15–10
Starting Lineups:
BYU: Brenna Chase, Shaylee Gonzales, Shalae Salmon, Paisley Johnson, Sara Hamson
Gonzaga: Zykera Rice, LeeAnne Wirth, Laura Stockton, Katie Campbell, Chandler Smith

San Diego
Broadcasters: Dave McCann & Kristen Kozlowski
Series History: BYU leads series 13–6
Starting Lineups:
San Diego: Aminata Dosso, Madison Pollock, Sydney Shephard, Sydney Hunter, Patricia Brossman
BYU: Brenna Chase, Shaylee Gonzales, Shalae Salmon, Paisley Johnson, Sara Hamson

San Francisco
Broadcasters: Robbie Bullough & Makenzi Pulsipher
Series History: BYU leads series 18–5
Starting Lineups:
San Francisco: Moa Lundqvist, Nia Alexander, Lucija Kostic, Shannon Powell, Abby Rathbun
BYU: Brenna Chase, Shaylee Gonzales, Caitlyn Alldredge, Paisley Johnson, Sara Hamson

Santa Clara
Broadcasters: Spencer Linton, Kristen Kozlowski, & Lauren McClain
Series History: BYU leads series 15–2
Starting Lineups:
Santa Clara: Tia Hay, Lauren Yearwood, Naomi Jimenez, Ashlyn Herlihy, Emily Wolph
BYU: Brenna Chase, Shaylee Gonzales, Caitlyn, Alldredge, Paisley Johnson, Sara Hamson

Pepperdine
Broadcasters: Spencer Linton & Kristen Kozlowski
Series History: BYU leads series 18–3
Starting Lineups:
Pepperdine: Malia Bambrick, Megan House, Barbara Sitanggan, Yasmine Robinson-Bac, Mia Satie
BYU: Brenna Chase, Shaylee Gonzales, Caitlyn, Alldredge, Paisley Johnson, Sara Hamson

Gonzaga
Broadcasters: Elise Woodward & Dan Hughes (ESPN)/ Greg Wrubell & Kristen Kozlowski'' (BYU Radio)
Series History: Gonzaga leads series 15–11
Starting Lineups:
BYU: Brenna Chase, Shaylee Gonzales, Shalae Salmon, Paisley Johnson, Sara Hamson
Gonzaga: Zykera Rice, LeeAnne Wirth, Jessie Loera, Katie Campbell, Chandler Smith

Rankings
2018–19 NCAA Division I women's basketball rankings

See also
 2018–19 BYU Cougars men's basketball team

References

BYU Cougars women's basketball seasons
BYU
BYU Cougars
BYU Cougars
BYU